Patna railway station was a railway station serving Patna, East Ayrshire, Scotland. The station was originally part of the Ayr and Dalmellington Railway, worked and later owned by the Glasgow and South Western Railway.

History 
The station opened in 1897, having moved around 150 metres south from the original station site that had opened on 7 August 1856. The second station's site was closed by the British Railways Board in 1964.p

The station had a single platform, a signal box near the road overbridge, a few sidings and a goods shed. The platform has been demolished and a private dwelling is now located at the site of the old station building.

References

Notes

Sources

External links
Patna station
Site of Patna station

Disused railway stations in East Ayrshire
Railway stations in Great Britain opened in 1897
Railway stations in Great Britain closed in 1964
Former Glasgow and South Western Railway stations
Beeching closures in Scotland